Shiv Mandir may refer to the following temples:

Shiv Shani Mandir, Dhori, Jharkhand, India
Shiv Mandir, Ambarnath, Maharashtra, India
Paraheda Shiv Mandir, Partapur, Rajasthan, India
Sagar Shiv Mandir, island of Goyave de Chine, Mauritius
Shiv Mandir, Umerkot, Sindh, Pakistan
Shiv Mandir, Kiloi, Haryana, India
Temple in the Sea, Carapichaima, Caroni County, Couva-Tabaquite-Talparo, Trinidad and Tobago